Cédric Soulette (born 30 May 1972) is a French rugby union footballer. He currently plays for the AS Béziers club. In the past, he also played for Toulouse and ASM Clermont Auvergne. His usual position is as a prop. He has also played for the French national team and was a part of their 1998 Grand Slam team. He was also involved in the IRB Rugby Aid Match. Whilst at Toulouse he was a replacement as they won the 2003 Heineken Cup.

References

External links
 ERC Rugby profile
 2Rugby profile

1972 births
French rugby union players
Living people
Sportspeople from Béziers
Rugby union props
Stade Toulousain players
ASM Clermont Auvergne players
France international rugby union players
AS Béziers Hérault players